Adik Sa'Yo (International title: Love Games / ) is a 2009 Philippine television drama romantic comedy series broadcast by GMA Network. Directed by Joel Lamangan and Lore Reyes, it stars Jolina Magdangal, Jennica Garcia, Dennis Trillo and Marvin Agustin. It premiered on June 8, 2009 on the network's Telebabad line up replacing All About Eve. The series concluded on September 11, 2009 with a total of 70 episodes. It was replaced by Stairway to Heaven in its timeslot.

The series was released in DVD by GMA Records.

Cast and characters

Lead cast
Jolina Magdangal as Joanna Maglipot (Lindenberg)
Marvin Agustin as Carlos Manansala
Dennis Trillo as Ruben Domingo
Jennica Garcia as Karen Maglipot

Supporting cast
Elizabeth Oropesa as Stella Maglipot
Joey Marquez as Luigi Maglipot
Eugene Domingo as Fatima Lindenberg
Chanda Romero as Aurora Manansala
Pauleen Luna as Camille Sickat
Chariz Solomon as Emelene Santos
Benjie Paras as Benjo
Iwa Moto as Andrea
German Moreno as Joe
Tony Mabesa as Samuel
Luz Valdez as Caring Domingo
Ces Quesada as Ising Domingo
Vaness del Moral as Racquel Domingo
John Lapus as July
Sandy Talag as Ria Domingo
Jim Pebanco as Roman
Mosang as Mila
Renerich Ocon as Penelope

Guest cast
Wendell Ramos as James
Chynna Ortaleza as Liza
Isabel Granada as Doy
Dang Cruz as Estrelita
Polo Ravales as himself
SexBomb Girls as themselves 
Yassi Pressman as Lucinda Bartolome
Mang Enriquez as Katong
Dinky Doo as Dodong
Rosemarie Sarita as Matilda
Raquel Villavicencio as Mercy

Ratings
According to AGB Nielsen Philippines' Mega Manila household television ratings, the pilot episode of Adik Sa'Yo earned a 25.4% rating. While the final episode scored a 34.1% rating.

References

External links
 

2009 Philippine television series debuts
2009 Philippine television series endings
Filipino-language television shows
GMA Network drama series
Philippine romantic comedy television series
Television shows set in the Philippines